Edgar Caparrós Ruiz (born 19 March 1997) is a Spanish footballer.

Career
In 2017, he signed for Ukrainian top flight outfit NK Veres Rivne, making 3 appearances there.

In 2018, he signed for Rieti in the Italian third division, failing to make an appearance there, before playing for Spanish fourth division teams UD Socuéllamos and CD Torrijos.

In 2020, Caparrós returned to the Ukrainian top flight with FC Mynai. On 16 December 2020 he left FC Mynai.

References

External links
 Edgar Caparrós at Soccerway

Spanish footballers
Spanish expatriate footballers
Living people
Association football defenders
Association football midfielders
1997 births
FC Mynai players
NK Veres Rivne players
FC Zugdidi players
Spanish expatriate sportspeople in Ukraine
Expatriate footballers in Ukraine
Spanish expatriate sportspeople in Georgia (country)
Expatriate footballers in Georgia (country)
Spanish expatriate sportspeople in Italy
Expatriate footballers in Italy